Brehme may refer to:

People with the surname
Albert Brehme, German bobsledder
Andreas Brehme (born 1960), German football player and coach
Gerhard Brehme (1912–1943), German Wehrmacht officer and Knight's Cross of the Iron Cross recipient
Hans Brehme (1904–1957), German composer
Matthias Brehme (born 1943), German gymnast

Places
Brehme, Germany, a municipality in Eichsfeld district, Thuringia, Germany